The Cerro de Arcos (English: Hill of arches) is a windswept rock formation in the high páramo of the Ecuadorian southern sierra. It is situated on the border between the provinces El Oro and Loja, on the elevated plain between the Cordillera de Chilla and the Cordillera de Timbayacu at an altitude of 3,700 m (12,140 ft).

The rock formation features towers, columns, and several of the eponymous arches formed by wind and weather erosion.

Nearby populated places are Bellavista and Sabadel and the nearest villages or small towns are Zaruma and Manu.

References

External links
 Local Cerro de Arcos information with pictures

Cerro de Arcos
Cerro de Arcos